Badshah is a 1954 Bollywood film starring Mala Sinha and Pradeep Kumar.

Music
"Aa Nile Gagan Tale Pyaar Ham Kare" - Lata Mangeshkar, Hemant Kumar
"Gul Muskara Utha Bulbul Ye Ga Utha, Baghon Me Agayi Bahar" - Lata Mangeshkar
"Rulaa Kar Chal Diye Ik Din Hansi Ban Kar Jo Aaye The" - Hemant Kumar
"Jee Ghabraye Dil Jal Jaye Bedardi Ab To Aa Jaa, Saase Ruke Ghutata Hai Dam" - Lata Mangeshkar
"Jaage Mera Dil Soye Zamaana Mehfil DoorNahi" - Aparesh Lahiri
"Janam Maran Ka Saath Tum Ankh Churao To Kya, In Ankhon Ko Tumse Pyar Hai" - Lata Mangeshkar
"Jab Pal Bhar, Jab Pal Bhar Chain Na Paaon Re Balam, To Kaise Bitayu Din Ratiya" - Lata Mangeshkar
"Le Gaya, Le Gaya, Dil Le Gaya Dil Mere Sapno Me Aake" - Lata Mangeshkar

References

External links
 

1954 films
Films scored by Shankar–Jaikishan
1950s Hindi-language films
Indian black-and-white films